Simon Edem Asimah is an Architect/Quantity surveyor and a politician of the Republic of Ghana. He is the member of Parliament for South Dayi in the Volta region of Ghana.

Personal life 
Simon is married with five children. He is a Christian (Evangelical Presbyterian).

Early life and education 
Simon Edem Asimah was born on 19 March 1955. He is an indegene of Peki-Wudome in the Volta region of Ghana.

He had a Master of Arts degree in Development Studies. He further studied ISS in the Hague in Netherlands in the year 1992.

Politics 
Simon is a member of the National Democratic Congress. He represented South Dayi Constituency in the 5th Parliament of the 4th Republic. In December 2012, He also emerged winner in the 2012 Ghanaian General Elections with a massive win of 87.5% of the total valid votes in his Constituency which became his second run as the MP for South Dayi. He was the Chairman of the Committee on Environment, Science and Technology.

Employment 
Reg. Director, Greater Accra Regional Office of Community Water and Sanitation Agency.

He is a Development Planner, an architect, and quantity surveyors.

References 

People from Volta Region
National Democratic Congress (Ghana) politicians
1955 births
Living people